Vertebrata subulifera (Polysiphonia subulifera (C.Agardh) Harvey)  is  rather small marine alga in the division Rhodophyta.

Description
This alga consists of branched thalli growing to a length of 20 cm. It grows as tufts of very branched axes attached by rhizoids. A main branched is absent. In section the main branches can be seen to be composed of a central axis  with 12 pericentral cells all of equal length. Trichoblasts are abundant.

Similar to Vertebrata fruticulosa (Boergeseniella fruticulosa) which it is distinguished by small corticated cells.

Habitat
Growing on the seashore on pebbles and other surfaces at the very low water.

Distribution
Ireland, Great Britain and north-west France.

References

Rhodomelaceae